The 2020-21 Wisconsin Badgers men's ice hockey season was the 72nd season of play for the program and the 21st season in the Big Ten Conference. The Badgers represented the University of Wisconsin–Madison and were coached by Tony Granato, in his 5th season.

Season
As a result of the ongoing COVID-19 pandemic the entire college ice hockey season was delayed. Because the NCAA had previously announced that all winter sports athletes would retain whatever eligibility they possessed through at least the following year, none of Wisconsin's players would lose a season of play. However, the NCAA also approved a change in its transfer regulations that would allow players to transfer and play immediately rather than having to sit out a season, as the rules previously required.

Wisconsin entered the season having to rely on an entirely new troop of goaltenders, having lost all of their netminders from the year before. That wasn't an unfortunate circumstance as the Badgers had been one of the worst teams in the nation in terms of goals allowed. Senior transfer Robbie Beydoun was the first goalie to start for the team and Wisconsin started well, winning four of their first six games (all against ranked teams). After getting embarrassed by Arizona State in late November, Tony Granato began rotating his starting goalies and the team responded by handing #1 Minnesota their first loss of the season. With the team beginning to fire on all cylinders, Cole Caufield came into his own and rocketed up the national scoring standings. Caufield's goal-scoring helped the Badgers win 13 out of 16 games and finish atop the Big Ten by .002. The drastic turnaround was the first time a team had gone from worst to first in any conference standings since Maine in 1995 (though that included 14 forfeited games).

As the top seed, Wisconsin received a bye into the Big Ten semifinals but, when they hit the ice, the team appeared to have lost some its steam. The Badgers had to twice recover from Penn State leads in the third period before dominating in the overtime session. The championship game versus Minnesota saw more loose play and the Gophers scored four goals in the second period to take a 4-goal edge. The Badgers tried to come back in the final frame, scoring three times but an empty-net goal sealed their defeat.

Despite the championship loss, Wisconsin was ranked 4th by the NCAA selection committee and given the top spot for the East Region in the NCAA Tournament. The Badgers opened against Bemidji State and for the third consecutive game they got off to a slow start. The Beavers scored twice in the first, including a goal with less than 20 seconds remaining. After Wisconsin cut the lead in half, BSU scored two more before the end of the second, including one off a terrible turnover by Beydoun. Cameron Rowe was in net to start the third but it didn't appear to make much difference as Bemidji State scored again to push their lead to four. Caufield scored twice in the third to try and spark a comeback but the deficit was too great and The Badgers' campaign ended on a 3–6 loss.

Ben Garrity sat out the season.

Departures

Recruiting

Roster
As of August 31, 2020.

Standings

Schedule and Results

|-
!colspan=12 style=";" | Regular season

|-
!colspan=12 style=";" | 

|-
!colspan=12 style=";" |

Scoring statistics

Goaltending statistics

Rankings

USCHO did not release a poll in week 20.

Awards and honors

2021 NHL Entry Draft

† incoming freshman

References

External links

Wisconsin Badgers men's ice hockey seasons
Wisconsin Badgers
Wisconsin Badgers
Wisconsin Badgers
Wisconsin Badgers
Wisconsin Badgers